This is the discography of Scottish punk rock band Skids.

Albums

Studio albums

Live albums

Compilation albums

Video albums

EPs

Singles

Notes

References

Discographies of British artists
Punk rock group discographies
New wave discographies